Phyllocnistis titania is a moth of the family Gracillariidae, known from Sumatra, Indonesia. The hostplant for the species is Premna tomentosa.

References

Phyllocnistis
Endemic fauna of Indonesia